Cis Corman (May 12, 1926 – April 27, 2020), born Eleanor Tobe Cohen, was an American casting director and film producer. She worked closely with Barbra Streisand and Martin Scorsese during her long career.

Early life 
Eleanor Tobe Cohen was born in Chelsea, Massachusetts and raised in Brookline, Massachusetts, the daughter of Mr. and Mrs. Albert A. Cohen. Her family was Jewish. She graduated from Green Mountain College.

Career 
Corman was a mother of four, taking an acting class, when she met and encouraged a teenaged fellow student, Barbra Streisand. She later appeared with Streisand in Funny Girl (1968), worked as casting director on Streisand's Yentl (1983), and became president of Streisand's Barwood Films in 1984. She held producer credits on Nuts (1987), The Prince of Tides (1991), Serving in Silence: The Margarethe Cammermeyer Story (1995), The Mirror Has Two Faces (1996), Rescuers: Stories of Courage: Two Women (1998), The Long Island Incident (1998), Varian's War (2001), What Makes a Family (2001), and Reel Models: The First Women of Film (2001).

Corman was also casting director on other films, including Death Wish (1974), The Deer Hunter (1978), The Eyes of Laura Mars (1978), Raging Bull (1980), Heaven's Gate (1980), The King of Comedy (1982), Once Upon a Time in America (1984), and The Last Temptation of Christ (1988).

Corman won a Peabody Award and was nominated for an Emmy Award and a Golden Globe Award in 1995, for Serving in Silence.

Personal life 
Eleanor Tobe Cohen married Harvey Harold Corman, a psychiatrist, in 1946. They had four children, including photographer Richard Corman. Her husband died in 2001. She died in 2020, aged 93, at her home in New York City. Her brother-in-law was poet and translator Cid Corman.

References

External links 

 
 
 Peabody Award Acceptance Speech, 1995, by Cis Corman, Craig Zadan and Neil Meron, on YouTube.

1926 births
2020 deaths
American casting directors
Women casting directors
American film producers
American Jews
People from Brookline, Massachusetts
Green Mountain College alumni
Peabody Award winners
People from Chelsea, Massachusetts